Marcus "Max" van Gelder (20 October 1924 – 7 December 2019) was a Dutch water polo player who won a European title in 1950 and placed fifth at the 1952 Olympics.

See also
 Netherlands men's Olympic water polo team records and statistics
 List of men's Olympic water polo tournament goalkeepers

References

External links
 

1924 births
2019 deaths
Sportspeople from The Hague
Dutch male water polo players
Water polo goalkeepers
Olympic water polo players of the Netherlands
Water polo players at the 1952 Summer Olympics
Dutch people of the Dutch East Indies
20th-century Dutch people